Aulacoptera fuscinervalis is a moth in the family Crambidae. It was described by Charles Swinhoe in 1895. It is found in India.

References

Moths described in 1895
Pyraustinae
Moths of Asia